(February 2, 1952 – September 12, 2022) was a Japanese voice actor. He is best known for voicing Giichi in Naruto and Julius in Berserk.

Life and career 
Mizuno was born on February 2, 1952, in Gifu. He was a graduate of Nagoya University.

Mizuno died of sepsis on September 12, 2022, at the age of 70.

Filmography 
 1983: Tuesday Suspense Theater

Voice Acting 
 1997: Virtua Fighter - Dr. Ivanoff
 1997: B't X - B'T Radio
 1997: Berserk - Julius
 1999: Turn A Gundam - Meme Midguard
 2001: Geisters: Fractions of the Earth - Soja
 2002: Naruto - Giichi
 2003: Kino's Journey - Old Man A
 2003: Last Exile - Graf
 2004: Tales of Phantasia: The Animation - Minister
 2005: Last Order: Final Fantasy VII - Commander
 2006: Tokko - Taishi
 2006: Death Note - Shussekisha B
 2008: Spice and Wolf - Kizoku
 2010: Tegamibachi - Danchou
 2010: Naruto: Shippûden - Gilchi
 2017: Lu Over the Wall - Nodoguro
 2018: Zombie Land Saga - Master

 Dubbing 
 Die Hard with a Vengeance (1999 TV Asahi edition) - Joe Lambert (Graham Greene)
 Downfall - Joseph Goebbels (Ulrich Matthes)
 Shaolin Soccer'' - Team Evil's Striker (Shik Zi-yun)

References 

1952 births
2022 deaths
Japanese male actors
Japanese male voice actors
Nagoya University alumni
People from Gifu
Male voice actors from Gifu Prefecture
Deaths from sepsis